Richmond was a provincial electoral district in the Canadian province of British Columbia.  It made its first appearance on the hustings in the election of 1903. It lasted until the 1920 election, after which it lost some territory to the new South Vancouver riding, and became the new riding of Richmond-Point Grey. There was again an electoral district called Richmond from 1966 through the 1986 provincial elections.

For other Richmond-area ridings, and other ridings in the Lower Mainland, please see New Westminster (electoral districts).  For ridings in the City of Vancouver or on the North Shore, please see Vancouver (electoral districts).

Electoral history 
Note:  Winners of each election are in bold.

|Conservative
|Francis Lovett Carter-Cotton
|align="right"|460
|align="right"|58.97%
|align="right"|
|align="right"|unknown

|Liberal
|John Cunningham Brown
|align="right"|320 	 	
|align="right"|41.03%
|align="right"|
|align="right"|unknown
|- bgcolor="white"
!align="right" colspan=3|Total valid votes
!align="right"|780 	
!align="right"|100.00%
!align="right"|
|- bgcolor="white"
!align="right" colspan=3|Total rejected ballots
!align="right"|
!align="right"|
!align="right"|
|- bgcolor="white"
!align="right" colspan=3|Turnout
!align="right"|%
!align="right"|
!align="right"|
|}

 
|Conservative
|Francis Lovett Carter-Cotton
|align="right"|417
|align="right"|48.04%
|align="right"|
|align="right"|unknown

|Liberal
|John Walter Weart
|align="right"|403 	
|align="right"|46.43%
|align="right"|
|align="right"|unknown
|- bgcolor="white"
!align="right" colspan=3|Total valid votes
!align="right"|868
!align="right"|100.00%
!align="right"|
|- bgcolor="white"
!align="right" colspan=3|Total rejected ballots
!align="right"|
!align="right"|
!align="right"|
|- bgcolor="white"
!align="right" colspan=3|Turnout
!align="right"|%
!align="right"|
!align="right"|
|}	

 
|Conservative
|Francis Lovett Carter-Cotton
|align="right"|918
|align="right"|57.92%
|align="right"|
|align="right"|unknown
 
|Liberal
|John Wallace deBeque Farris
|align="right"|667 	  	    		
|align="right"|42.08%
|align="right"|
|align="right"|unknown
|- bgcolor="white"
!align="right" colspan=3|Total valid votes
!align="right"|1,585 
!align="right"|100.00%
!align="right"|
|- bgcolor="white"
!align="right" colspan=3|Total rejected ballots
!align="right"|
!align="right"|
!align="right"|
|- bgcolor="white"
!align="right" colspan=3|Turnout
!align="right"|%
!align="right"|
!align="right"|
|}

 
|Conservative
|Francis Lovett Carter-Cotton
|align="right"|Acclaimed 		
|align="right"| -.- %
|align="right"|
|align="right"|unknown
|- bgcolor="white"
!align="right" colspan=3|Total valid votes
!align="right"|n/a
!align="right"| -.- %
!align="right"|
|- bgcolor="white"
!align="right" colspan=3|Total rejected ballots
!align="right"|
!align="right"|
!align="right"|
|- bgcolor="white"
!align="right" colspan=3|Turnout
!align="right"|%
!align="right"|
!align="right"|
|}	

 
|Conservative
|William Joseph Baird
|align="right"|1,189 		 	
|align="right"|44.62%
|align="right"|
|align="right"|unknown
|-
|
|Independent Conservative
|Robert McBride 1 
|align="right"|35 			
|align="right"|1.31%
|align="right"|
|align="right"|unknown
 
|Conservative
|Gerald Grattan McGeer
|align="right"|1,441 		 	 	
|align="right"|54.07%
|align="right"|
|align="right"|unknown
|- bgcolor="white"
!align="right" colspan=3|Total valid votes
!align="right"|2,665 	
!align="right"|100.00%
!align="right"|
|- bgcolor="white"
!align="right" colspan=3|Total rejected ballots
!align="right"|
!align="right"|
!align="right"|
|- bgcolor="white"
!align="right" colspan=3|Turnout
!align="right"|%
!align="right"|
!align="right"|
|- bgcolor="white"
!align="right" colspan=7|1 Withdrew. The votes cast are from the overseas ballots.
|}

External links

Sources 
Elections BC Historical Returns

Former provincial electoral districts of British Columbia
Politics of Richmond, British Columbia